Ben Lewis born 26 August 1986 in Swansea, Wales is a former rugby union player for the Ospreys in the Celtic League. A  flanker, he was forced to retire due to injury in March 2011

His brother Sam Lewis is also a professional rugby union player.

References

External links
Ospreys profile

1986 births
Living people
Rugby union players from Swansea
Ospreys (rugby union) players
Welsh rugby union players
Rugby union flankers